Cagayancillo, officially the Municipality of Cagayancillo,  is a 6th class municipality in the province of Palawan, Philippines. According to the 2020 census, it has a population of 6,884 people.

Located between the islands of Palawan and Negros in the Sulu Sea, Cagayancillo is the closest settlement to the Tubbataha National Marine Park. The word Cagayancillo is Spanish meaning "Little Cagayan".

History
The island was known to the first Spanish settlers in the Archipelago simply as Cagayan. They describe this territory as "two low islets about fifteen leagues from the island of Panay". They ruled these islets from the town of Arevalo in Iloilo by sailing south-southeast from this part of Panay, to the open sea. The islands are surrounded by many low reefs. But the Spaniards were able to discover their narrow entry, avoiding the great danger that awaited ships.

During the early period of Spanish colonizations, these small islets were inhabited by four hundred people, all of whom were very skillful shipbuilders. They were from Panay, and they came to these islets in order to fortify themselves by the reefs, for fear of pirates. Then they undertook to return to Panay in order to dwell there. But many of their women died there. Seeing this, as they were soothsayers, they returned to the islands of Cagayan, from where they set out every year, and scattered themselves over all the islands to build ships. They built the ships of the Spanish Royal Navy in the Philippines, as well as galleys, galliots, and frigates. They also helped in repairing and righting ships. Being the most important people in the islands for the Spaniards, the adelantado Miguel López de Legazpi allotted their islands to the encomenderos of Negros Island. Afterwards, the colonizers found it best to put them under the direct control of the Spanish Crown. Thus, it was governed from the town of Arevalo in Iloilo.

Historically, the islands also became part of Antique Province. It was made into a municipality in 1810, with Omabong as its first mayor.

During the American regime, it came under the jurisdiction of Negros Occidental.

In 1959, the following sitios were constituted into barrios of Cagayan:
 the sitios of Banted, Nipay, Dool, Cavili, Cabayog and Langtad, as barrio Talaga;
 the sitios of Ibiok, Panderse, Lato and Gatung-an, as barrio Mampio; and
 sitio Nusa as Barrio Nusa

Geography

The farthest provincial limit of the province of Palawan in the east is the island of municipality of Cagayancillo. It is located near the middle of the Sulu Sea.

There are neither mountain ranges nor forested areas in the municipality. A hilly portion in the north-eastern part of the main island has a slope of 3-82%. The other areas are flat with the highest elevation around 2 to 3 meters. The majority of the island has a sandy loam soil not enough to support a forest.

Barangays
Cagayancillo is the smallest municipality in the province of Palawan with a total land area of only  as of 2007.  The municipality is composed of 31 islands and islets and is subdivided into 12 barangays and two island sitios (Cavili and Calusa) included under the political jurisdiction of Magsaysay.

 Bantayan (Poblacion)
 Calsada (Poblacion)
 Convento (Poblacion)
 Lipot North (Poblacion)
 Lipot South (Poblacion)
 Magsaysay
 Mampio
 Nusa
 Santa Cruz
 Tacas (Poblacion)
 Talaga
 Wahig (Poblacion)

Climate

Cagayancillo belongs to Type II climate wherein there is no distinct wet or dry season. The dry season is usually from December to May with March as the driest month. The wet season is usually from May to November with August as the rainiest month.

The municipality is exposed to both monsoons. The Amihan or north-east winds blow from November to March while the Habagat or south-west winds visit the area from June to October. The summer months from April to June receive the moderate daplak wind from the north-west.

Demographics

Economy

Landmark

Cagayancillo Fort
Cagayancillo Fort is one of the surviving defense forts in Palawan built during the Spanish Colonial Period. Work on the fort was started in the late 16th century by Father Nicolas Melo and Father Alonso Colosa, but it was not completed till the early 18th century by Father Hipolito Casiano, spanning almost 130 years. The 162-sq. meter (1,740-sq. foot) diamond-shaped fort was built on the coast on a high point on the island and made from sea rocks mixed with lime. The other Spanish Colonial fortifications in Palawan are Fort Santa Isabel in Taytay and Cuyo Fort in Cuyo.

Healthcare
There are no hospitals in Cagayancillo.  Health facilities in the municipality consist of 1 rural health unit and 4 Barangay Health Stations.  In terms of health manpower, the municipality employs 1 municipal health officer, 1 public health nurse, 1 rural health midwife and 1 rural sanitary inspector. Medical interns spend 2-3 years practicing tropical medicine at Cagayancillo. This is the only time a medical doctor is in residence on the island.

Education
Cagayancillo has a total of 8 public elementary schools with a total of 37 classrooms. A total of 35 teachers are available in school year 2000–2001 for total enrollees of 1,110. This provides an average classroom - pupil ratio and teacher - pupil ratio 1:39. This ratio is above the national standard of 1:50 classroom - pupil and teacher- pupil ratios. Enrollment participation rate is estimated at 85.03% for school year 2000–2001. In secondary education, the municipality has one national high school located in the Poblacion. There were 9 classrooms and 13 secondary school teachers giving an average ratio of 1:52 classroom -student ratio. Secondary school participation rate was low at 69%.

See also
 List of islands of the Philippines

References

External links

Cagayancillo Profile at PhilAtlas.com
[ Philippine Standard Geographic Code]
Philippine Census Information
Local Governance Performance Management System

Municipalities of Palawan
Islands of Palawan
Island municipalities in the Philippines